The North American Network Operators' Group (NANOG)  is an educational and operational forum for the coordination and dissemination of technical information related to backbone/enterprise networking technologies and operational practices. It runs meetings, talks, surveys, and an influential mailing list for Internet service providers. The main method of communication is the NANOG mailing list (known informally as nanog-l), a free mailing list to which anyone may subscribe or post.

Meetings 
NANOG meetings are held three times each year, and include presentations, tutorials, and BOFs (Birds of a Feather meetings). There are also 'lightning talks', where speakers can submit brief presentations (no longer than 10 minutes), on a very short term. The meetings are informal, and membership is open. Conference participants typically include senior engineering staff from tier 1 and tier 2 ISPs. Participating researchers present short summaries of their work for operator feedback. In addition to the conferences, NANOG On the Road events offer single-day professional development and networking events touching on current NANOG discussion topics.

Organization 
NANOG meetings are organized by NewNOG, Inc., a Delaware non-profit organization, which took over responsibility for NANOG from the Merit Network in February 2011. Meetings are hosted by NewNOG and other organizations from the U.S. and Canada. Overall leadership is provided by the NANOG Steering Committee, established in 2005, and a Program Committee.

History 
NANOG evolved from the NSFNET "Regional-Techs" meetings, where technical staff from the regional networks met to discuss operational issues of common concern with each other and with the Merit engineering staff. At the February 1994 regional techs meeting in San Diego, the group revised its charter to include a broader base of network service providers, and subsequently adopted NANOG as its new name. 
NANOG was organized by Merit Network, a non-profit Michigan organization, from 1994 through 2011 when it was transferred to NewNOG.

Funding 
Funding for NANOG originally came from the National Science Foundation, as part of two projects Merit undertook in partnership with NSF and other organizations: the NSFNET Backbone Service and the Routing Arbiter project. All NANOG funds now come from conference registration fees and donations from vendors, and starting in 2011, membership dues.

Scope 
NANOG meetings provide a forum for the exchange of technical information, and promote discussion of implementation issues that require community cooperation. Coordination among network service providers helps ensure the stability of overall service to network users. The group's charter is available on the official NANOG website.

Topics 
The NANOG Program Committee publishes a Call for Presentations as well as proposes topics that address current operational issues. The committee's criteria for selecting talks are outlined on the Call for Presentations: the talks focus on large-scale backbone operations, ISP coordination, or technologies that are already deployed or soon to be deployed in core Internet backbones and exchange points. Popular topics include traffic engineering, applications of new protocols, routing policy specification, queue management and congestion, routing scalability, caching, and inter-provider security, to name a few.

See also
 Internet network operators' group

References

External links 

Computer networking
Electronic mailing lists
Internet Network Operators' Groups
History of the Internet